Chepang is a language spoken by approximately 37,000 people in South-Central Nepal. The people are known as Chepang. Randy LaPolla (2003) proposes that Chepang may be part of a larger "Rung" group. Another group who speaks Chepang, living across the Narayani river, call themselves Bujheli.

Phonology

Consonants

Phonetic Realizations 
The glottal stop is realized in some contexts, though usually not as a full closure and is instead presented as falling pitch, laryngealization, re-articulation, or by lengthening of the segment before. Some example of possible occurrences are listed below:

 Syllable Initial
 Full closure [ʔ] at the beginning of words — (ʔ / #__)
 Re-articulation [<] at the beginning of words — (< / #__)
 Laryngealization [◌̰] after a vowel and a glottal stop /ʔ/ — (~ / Vʔ__)
 Lengthening of previous segment [:] after non-glottal consonants — ( : / C[-glottal]__)
 Syllable Final
 Full closure at the end of words — (ʔ / __#) or when following a vowel and preceding a voiceless consonant — (ʔ / V__C[-voice])
 Laryngealization following a vowel and preceding a glottal stop — (◌̰ / V__ʔ)
 And falling pitch in all other contexts

The glottal fricative /h/ is realized in many ways and it is much more predictable in the environments that realizations occur. For example:

 In the case of two contiguous segments, if at the beginning of a word the first phoneme becomes voiceless
 If at the end of a word then the second phoneme becomes voiceless
 the word aal (meaning 'the track or scent of an animal') is phonemically transcribed as [ḁal]
 and the word samm (meaning 'fuzz of bamboo') is phonemically transcribed as [samm̥]
 Strong aspiration occurs on voiceless obstruents 
 the word phek (meaning 'broom') is phonemically transcribed as [phek]
 Breathy voice on the initial part of the syllable in the environment of voiced obstruents
 the word gaŋ (meaning 'hole') is transcribed as [ɡ̈a̤ŋ]
 /h/ may become /s/ in fast speech when following /j/ and preceding /k/
 /h/ may also become /x/ when contiguous to /j/ and preceding /ʔ/

The voiceless alveolar sibilant /s/ is also realized as /ʃ/ before front vowels.

/w/ when directly next to front vowels is realized as the labio-dental approximant [ʋ]

Vowels 

Research suggests that Chepang may have had a three vowel system at one point in time. Those vowels being /i/ /u/ and /ə/, this is uncommon for a three vowel system as commonly they consist of /a/ /i/ and /u/ as seen in Classical Arabic, Greenlandic and Quechua.

Syntax 
Chepang can be described as having a basic word order of Subject Object Verb (SOV) with some alterations due to context. The text below provides an example:But it is difficult to define a subject and object for the language in Chepang and may be more accurately described as a verb-final language. The verb does, for the most part, follow its related noun phrases and other constituents. Though it is not uncommon to see the NP follow the verb used as an afterthought.

Geographical distribution
Chepang is spoken in the following districts of Nepal (Ethnologue).

Makwanpur District, Bagmati Province
Chitwan District, Bagmati Province
Southern Dhading District, Bagmati Province
Southern Gorkha District, Gandaki Province

Dialects are Western Chepang and Eastern Chepang.

References

External links
The Chepang Language - Linguistics research and language documentation -
The Leopard and the Cat - Chepang Audio Recording

Languages of Nepal
Magaric languages
Vulnerable languages
Languages of Bagmati Province